Amos Henry Worthen (1813–1888) was an American geologist and paleontologist from Illinois. He was the second state geologist of Illinois and the first curator of the Illinois State Museum. He was a fellow of the American Association for the Advancement of Science and a member of the American Philosophical Society (1863) and the National Academy of Sciences.

References

White, Charles A. (1893). Memoir of Amos Henry Worthen. Biographical Memoirs of the National Academy of Sciences

1813 births
1888 deaths
19th-century American geologists
American paleontologists
Fellows of the American Association for the Advancement of Science
Members of the United States National Academy of Sciences
People from Bradford, Vermont
People from Warsaw, Illinois